Central railway station is located on the North Coast line in Queensland, Australia. It is the principal station on the City network and is located in the north of the Brisbane central business district. Central station is one of four inner city stations that form a core corridor through the centre of Brisbane.

History

The first building for Central railway station was a structure of wood and corrugated galvanised iron, and opened on 18 August 1889 as the terminus of the line when it was extended from Roma Street railway station. In 1891, the tunnel to Brunswick Street station (now Fortitude Valley) was opened so trains could run directly from Central to northern destinations.

An elegant new station was constructed and opened in 1899 with arches of corrugated galvanised iron over the platforms and a portico on Ann Street. A new entrance with its distinctive row of clocks was constructed in 1901 in sandstone from nearby quarries. In 1904, Central had the only electro-pneumatic system in Australia for changing points and signals.

The station had two through and two bay platforms. In 1909, the bay platforms were converted to through platforms.

In the 1940s, an American soldier was arrested after stabbing a Brisbane woman and a group of Australian soldiers. 

Ann Street was widened in 1954 for the construction of government offices which required the portico to be demolished. The vaulted roof was removed in 1966 and replaced by awnings over each platform.

Between 1968 and 1970, the station was redeveloped with office towers built over the platforms at the Edward Street end, involving the demolition of the 1901 entrance buildings and the construction of a modern pedestrian retail concourse behind the old station buildings. Further redevelopment saw the Sheraton Hotel Towers (now Sofitel Brisbane) constructed in 1984 over the remaining platforms.

As part of the quadruplication of the line from Roma Street station to Bowen Hills, Platforms 5 and 6 opened on 11 June 1996.

In early 2017, a major upgrade to the station commenced.

Station configuration
Central railway station is located at the northern end of the Brisbane central business district on Ann Street, directly opposite Anzac Square. Pedestrian access is available from the main entrance at the corner of Ann and Edward Streets, the pedestrian subway connecting Anzac Square with Upper Edward Street and from the corner of Ann Street and Creek Street. Lesser used access points are located off Wickham Terrace and from Edward Street via the courtyard of the Railway Centre.

There is elevator access to Central Station from Ann Street opposite the Shrine of Remembrance, and from Wickham Terrace on the northern corner of the complex. There are also escalators to Central station from Anzac Square Arcade, next to Anzac Square.

Services
Central station is served by all suburban and interurban City network lines. Also see Inner City timetable.

By platform

References

External links

Central station Queensland Rail
Central station Queensland's Railways on the Internet

Ann Street, Brisbane
Edward Street, Brisbane
History of Brisbane
Listed railway stations in Australia
North Coast railway line, Queensland
Queensland Heritage Register
Railway stations in Brisbane
Railway stations in Australia opened in 1889